Hustad is a village in Fræna Municipality in Møre og Romsdal county, Norway.

Hustad may also refer to:

 Hustad (surname), including a list of people with the name
 Hustad Church, a church in Inderøy municipality in Trøndelag county, Norway
 Hustad Church (Fræna), a church in Fræna municipality in Møre og Romsdal county, Norway
 Hustad Municipality, a former municipality in Møre og Romsdal county, Norway
 Hustad, also known as Sandvollan, a former municipality in Nord-Trøndelag county, Norway

See also
 Hustadvika, a coastal area in Møre og Romsdal county, Norway
 Hustadvika (municipality), a municipality, established in 2020, in Møre og Romsdal county, Norway
 Husted, a similarly spelled surname